The University of Pennsylvania, often abbreviated simply as Penn or UPenn, is a private Ivy League research university in Philadelphia. It identifies as the fourth-oldest institution of higher education in the United States, though this representation is challenged by other universities. Benjamin Franklin and other Philadelphians established the university in 1749, which would make it the fifth-oldest institution of higher education.

The university has four undergraduate schools and 12 graduate and professional schools. Schools enrolling undergraduates include the College of Arts and Sciences, the School of Engineering and Applied Science, the Wharton School, and the School of Nursing. Among its highly ranked graduate schools are its law school, whose first professor James Wilson participated in writing the first draft of the U.S. Constitution, its medical school, the first in North America, and Wharton, the nation's first collegiate business school. Penn's endowment is US$20.7 billion, making it the sixth-wealthiest academic institutions in the nation as of 2022. In 2020, the university was awarded $1.5 billion in research grants, the fourth-largest of any U.S. university.

Penn was one of nine colonial colleges chartered prior to the U.S. Declaration of Independence when Benjamin Franklin, the university's founder and first president, advocated for an educational institution that trained leaders in academia, commerce, and public service. The campus, located in the University City neighborhood of West Philadelphia, is centered around College Hall. Notable campus landmarks include Houston Hall, the first modern student union, and Franklin Field, the nation's first dual-level college football stadium and oldest NCAA Division I college football stadium in continuous operation. Penn also is the home of Morris Arboretum, the official arboretum of the Commonwealth of Pennsylvania, which is located 15 miles northwest of the campus in the Chestnut Hill section of Philadelphia. The university's athletics program, the Penn Quakers, fields varsity teams in 33 sports as a member of NCAA Division I's Ivy League conference.

Since its founding, Penn alumni, trustees, and faculty have included eight signers of the Declaration of Independence, seven signers of the U.S. Constitution, two Presidents of the United States, three U.S. Supreme Court justices, 32 U.S. senators, 163 members of the U.S. House of Representatives, 12 U.S. Cabinet Secretaries, 46 governors, 27 State Supreme Court justices, and nine foreign heads of state. Alumni and faculty include 36 Nobel laureates. Penn has graduated 24 Rhodes Scholars and 21 Marshall Scholars. Penn alumni have won 28 Tony Awards, 16 Grammy Awards, 11 Emmy Awards, and four Academy Awards, and include one of only 17 people who have earned all four awards, known as an EGOT. Penn has the largest number of alumni on the Forbes 400 list of the wealthiest Americans out of all colleges and has the greatest number of undergraduate billionaire alumni of all colleges, with 64 living billionaires, 28 of whom are alumni of Penn's undergraduate schools. Penn alumni have won 81 Olympic medals, including 26 gold medals. Two Penn alumni have been NASA astronauts and five have been awarded the Medal of Honor.

History

Origins of the college

In 1749, Benjamin Franklin published a pamphlet, "Proposals Relating to the Education of Youth in Pennsylvania", in which he argued for establishing a Philadelphia-based institution that would provide higher education to its citizens. The proposal was seen as innovative at the time, and Franklin organized 24 trustees to help guide the institution he envisioned. The group acquired a dormant building after its owners asked Franklin's group to assume their debts and, accordingly, their inactive trusts. On February 1, 1750, a new board of trustees took over the building and trusts of the old board. On August 13, 1751, the Academy of Philadelphia, using the great hall at 4th and Arch Streets, was established and began taking in its first secondary students. A charity school also was chartered on July 13, 1753, by the intentions of the original donors, although it lasted only a few years. On June 16, 1755, the College of Philadelphia was chartered, paving the way for the addition of undergraduate instruction. All three schools shared the same board of trustees and were considered part of the same institution. The first commencement exercises were held on May 17, 1757.

The University of Pennsylvania considers itself the fourth-oldest institution of higher education in the United States, though this is contested by Princeton and Columbia Universities.

In 1740, a group of Philadelphians organized to erect a great preaching hall for George Whitefield, a traveling evangelist who toured the American colonies delivering open-air sermons. The building was designed and constructed by Edmund Woolley and was the largest building in Philadelphia at the time, drawing thousands of people the first time in which it was preached. The preaching hall was initially intended to also serve as a charity school, but a lack of funds forced plans for the chapel and school to be suspended. According to Franklin's autobiography, it was in 1743 when he first had the idea to establish an academy, "thinking the Rev. Richard Peters a fit person to superintend such an institution". However, Peters declined a casual inquiry from Franklin, though Peters was one of Penn's founding trustees [1749 to 1776], President of board of trustees [1756 to 1764], and Treasurer of board of trustees [1769 to 1770]) and nothing further was done by Franklin for another six years when he again contacted not just Peters but many others. In the fall of 1749, Franklin circulated a pamphlet titled "Proposals Relating to the Education of Youth in Pensilvania", his vision for what he called a "Public Academy of Philadelphia".

Unlike the other colonial colleges that existed in 1749, including Harvard, William & Mary, Yale, and the College of New Jersey, Franklin's new school did not focus exclusively on educating clergy. He advocated what was then an innovative concept of higher education, which taught both the ornamental knowledge of the arts and the practical skills necessary for making a living and performing public service. The proposed program of study could have become the nation's first modern liberal arts curriculum, although it was never implemented because Anglican priest William Smith, who became the first provost, and other trustees strongly preferred the traditional curriculum.

Franklin assembled a board of trustees from among Philadelphia's leading citizens, the first such non-sectarian board in the nation. At the first meeting of the 24 members of the board of trustees on November 13, 1749, the issue of where to locate the school was a prime concern. Although a lot across Sixth Street from the old Pennsylvania State House, later renamed and famously known since 1776 as Independence Hall, was offered without cost by James Logan, its owner, the trustees realized that the building erected in 1740, which was still vacant, was an even more preferable site.

The institution of higher learning was named and known as the College of Philadelphia from 1755 to 1779. In 1779, not trusting then provost William Smith's Loyalist tendencies, the revolutionary State Legislature created a university, and in 1785 the legislature changed name to University of the State of Pennsylvania. The result was a schism, with Smith continuing to operate an attenuated version of the College of Philadelphia. In 1791, the legislature issued a new charter, merging the two institutions into a new University of Pennsylvania with twelve men from each institution serving on the new board of trustees.

Although Penn began operating as an academy or secondary school in 1751 and obtained its collegiate charter in 1755, it initially designated 1750 as its founding date. Sometime later in its early history, Penn began naming 1749 as its founding date, which it continued to reference as the founding date for over a century, including at a centennial celebration in 1849. In 1899, the board of trustees voted to adjust the founding date earlier again, this time to 1740, the date of "the creation of the earliest of the many educational trusts the University has taken upon itself", according to a book on the university's history. The board of trustees voted in response to a three-year campaign by Penn's General Alumni Society to retroactively revise the university's founding date to 1740 for a number of reasons, including to appear older than Princeton University, which had been chartered in 1746.

First university
The University of Pennsylvania considers itself the first university in the United States with both undergraduate and graduate studies, though that claim is contested by other universities. Penn has two claims to being the first university in the United States, according to the former university archives director Mark Frazier Lloyd: 
 (1) the 1765 founding of the first medical school in America made Penn the first institution to offer both "undergraduate" and professional education ("the 'de facto' position") 

 (2) the 1779 charter made it the first American institution of higher learning to take the name of "University" ("the 'de jure' position").

Original campus
The Academy of Philadelphia, a secondary school for boys, began operations in 1751 in an unused church assembly hall building at 4th and Arch Streets, which had sat unfinished and dormant for over a decade. Upon receiving a collegiate charter in 1755, the first classes for the College of Philadelphia were taught in the same building, in many cases to the same boys who had already graduated from The Academy of Philadelphia.

Campus as Capital of United States
When the British abandoned Philadelphia during the Philadelphia campaign in the American Revolutionary War, College Hall, the college's only building at the time, served as the temporary meeting site of the Second Continental Congress from July 7 to July 20, 1778. The British Army, led by General William Howe, damaged many major parts of Philadelphia. Howe's attack caused significant damage to the Pennsylvania State House, now known as Independence Hall, the site where the Second Continental Congress had convened and which it was forced to abandon due to such attack. By July 7, 1778, the Second Continental Congress returned to Philadelphia with the requisite quorum, but convened at College Hall (as the Congress could not use the Independence Hall site damaged by the British), briefly establishing Penn's campus as one of the early capitals of the United States. Penn's brief status as the nation's capital is evidenced by a July 13, 1778 letter sent from Josiah Bartlett, a signatory to the Articles of Confederation and the Declaration of Independence, to John Langdon, who was also a Founding Father from New Hampshire. Langdon, who later became a signatory of the United States Constitution, wrote: "The Congress meets in the College Hall as the State House was left by the enemy in a most filthy and sordid situation, as were many of the public and private buildings in the City."

9th Street campus

In 1802, the university moved to the unused Presidential Mansion at Ninth and Market Streets, a building that both George Washington and John Adams had declined to occupy while Philadelphia was the temporary national capital.

Among the classes given in 1807 at this building were those offered by Benjamin Rush, a professor of chemistry, medical theory, and clinical practice who was also a signer of the United States Declaration of Independence, member of the Continental Congress, and surgeon general of the Continental Army. 

Classes were held in the mansion until 1829 when it was demolished. Architect William Strickland designed twin buildings on the same site, College Hall and Medical Hall (both 1829–1830), which formed the core of the Ninth Street Campus until Penn's move to West Philadelphia in the 1870s.

West Philadelphia campus

After being located in downtown Philadelphia for more than a century, the campus was moved across the Schuylkill River to property purchased from the Blockley Almshouse in West Philadelphia in 1872, where it has since remained in an area now known as University City.

Residential university

In the 1750s, roughly 40 percent of Penn students needed lodging since they came from areas in the U.S. that were too far to commute, or were international students. Before the completion of the construction of the first dormitory in 1765, out of town students were typically placed with guardians in the homes of faculty or in suitable boarding houses, such as the one run by widow Rachel Marks Graydon, mother of Penn College Class of 1775 student Alexander Graydon.

In 1765, the campus was expanded by opening of the newly completed dormitory run by Benjamin Franklin's collaborator on the study of electricity using electrostatic machines and related technology and Penn professor and chief master Ebenezer Kinnersley. Kinnersley was designated steward of the students in the dormitory and he and his wife were given disciplinary powers over the students and supervised the cleanliness of the students with respect to personal hygiene and washing of the students' dirty clothing. However, even after its construction, many students sought living quarters elsewhere, where they would have more personal freedom, resulting in a loss of funds to the university. In the fall of 1775, Penn's trustees voted to advertise to lease the dormitory to a private family who would board the pupils at lesser cost to Penn. In another attempt to control the off-campus activities of the students, the trustees agreed not to admit any out-of-town student unless he was lodged in a place which they and the faculty considered proper. As of 1779, Penn, through its trustees, owned three houses on Fourth Street, just north of the campus's new building with the largest residence located on the corner of Fourth and Arch Streets.

Starting in 1849 with formation of Penn's Eta chapter of Delta Phi by five founders and 15 initiates, Penn students began to establish residential fraternity houses. Since Penn only had limited housing near campus and since students, especially those at the medical school, came from all over the country, the students elected to fend for themselves rather than live in housing owned by Penn trustees. A number chose housing by pledging and living in Penn's first fraternities, which included Delta Phi, Zeta Psi, Phi Kappa Sigma, and Delta Psi. These first fraternities were located within walking distance of 9th and Chestnut Street since the campus was located from 1800 to 1872 on the west side of 9th Street, from Market Street on the north to Chestnut Street on the south. Zeta Psi Fraternity was located at the southeast corner of 10th Street and Chestnut Street, Delta Phi was located on the south side of 11th Street near Chestnut Street, and Delta Psi was located on the north side of Chestnut Street, west of 10th Street.

When Penn moved to West Philadelphia in 1872, the new campus and its associated fraternities centered on the intersection of Woodland Avenue, 36th Street, and Locust Street. Among the first fraternities to build near the new campus were Phi Delta Theta in 1883 and Psi Upsilon in 1891. By 1891, there were at least 17 fraternities at the university.

From its founding until construction of the Quadrangle Dormitories, which started construction in 1895, the university largely lacked university-owned housing with the exception of a significant part of the 18th century. A significant portion of the undergraduate population commuted from Delaware Valley locations, and a large number of students resided in the Philadelphia area. The medical school (with roughly half the students) was a significant exception to this trend as it attracted a more geographically diverse population of students. For example, in the 1850s when Penn's medical school accounted for two-thirds to three-quarters of the student body, over half of the population of the medical school was from the southern part of the United States.

The university experienced increased need for housing in the last decade of the 19th century and the first decades of the 20th century as it began to compete with peer institutions to recruit foreign students.

George Henderson, President of the College Class of 1889, wrote (in his monograph distributed to his classmates at their 20th reunion) that Penn's strong growth in acreage and number of buildings it constructed over the prior two decades (along with a near-quadrupling in the size of the student body) was accommodated by building the Men's Dormitory and the The Quad.

Henderson argued that building The Quad was influential in attracting students, and he appealed for it to be expanded:

In 1911, since it was difficult to house the international students due to the segregation-era housing regulations in Philadelphia and across the United States, the Christian Association at the University of Pennsylvania hired its first Foreign Mission Secretary, Reverend Alpheus Waldo Stevenson. By 1912, Stevenson focused almost all his efforts on the foreign students at Penn who needed help finding housing resulting in the Christian Association buying 3905 Spruce Street located adjacent to Penn's West Philadelphia campus. By January 1, 1918, 3905 Spruce Street officially opened under the sponsorship of the Christian Association as a Home for Foreign Students, which came to be known as the International Students' House with Reverend Stevenson as its first director. The International Students' House provided " ... counseling and information services for a host of problems foreign students might encounter, including language, financial, health and diet, immigration and technical problems as well as maladjustment to living in the United States. It was also used for recreation and leisure, as lounges had radio, phonograph and television facilities and there were game and reception rooms. The International Students' House also provided for programs including forums, debates, lectures, panels and planned trips and outings as well as weekend activities such as dances, films and game nights. Also, for the next thirty-three years, the International Students' House would be sponsored by the Christian Association of the University of Pennsylvania."

The success of efforts to reach out to the international students was reported in 1921 when the university reported that the university's 12,000 students at the time came from all 50 states and 253 came from at least 50 foreign countries and foreign territories, including India, South Africa, New Zealand, Australia, and "...every Latin American country, and most of the Oriental and European nations".

By 1931, first-year students were required to live in the quadrangle unless they received official permission to live with their families or other relatives. However, throughout this period and into the early post-World War II period, the undergraduate schools of the university continued to have a large commuting population. As an example, into the late 1940s, two-thirds of Penn women students were commuters.

After World War II, the university began a capital spending program to overhaul its campus, especially student housing. A large number of students migrating to universities under the G.I. Bill, and the ensuing increase in Penn's student population highlighted that Penn had outgrown previous expansions, which ended during the Great Depression era. But in addition to a significant student population from the Delaware Valley, the university continued to attract international students from at least 50 countries and from all 50 states as early as of the second decade of the 1920s. Penn Trustee Paul Miller wrote that, in the post-World War II era,: "[t]he bricks-and-mortar Capital Campaign of the Sixties...built the facilities that turned Penn from a commuter school to a residential one...." By 1961, 79% of male undergraduates and 57% of female undergraduates lived on campus.

Controversies
From 1930 to 1966, there were 54 documented Rowbottom riots, a student tradition of rioting which included everything from car smashing to panty raids. After 1966, there were five more instances of "Rowbottoms", the latest occurring in 1980.

In 1965, Penn students learned that the university was sponsoring research projects for the United States' chemical and biological weapons program. According to Herman and Rutman, the revelation that "CB Projects Spicerack and Summit were directly connected with U.S. military activities in Southeast Asia", caused students to petition Penn president Gaylord Harnwell to halt the program, citing the project as being "immoral, inhuman, illegal, and unbefitting of an academic institution". Members of the faculty believed that an academic university should not be performing classified research and voted to re-examine the university agency which was responsible for the project on November 4, 1965.

In 1983, members of the Animal Liberation Front broke into the Head Injury Clinical Research Laboratory in the School of Medicine and stole research audio and video tapes. The stolen tapes were given to PETA who edited the footage to create a film, Unnecessary Fuss. As a result of media coverage and pressure from animal rights activists, the project was closed down.

The school gained notoriety in 1993 for the water buffalo incident in which a student who told a group of mostly black female students to "shut up, you water buffalo" was charged with violating the university's racial harassment policy.

In 2022, some asked for the tenure of a University of Pennsylvania law school professor to be revoked after she said the country is "better off with fewer Asians."

Educational innovations

Penn's educational innovations include the nation's first medical school in 1765; the first university teaching hospital in 1874; the Wharton School, the world's first collegiate business school, in 1881; the first American student union building, Houston Hall, in 1896; the country's second school of veterinary medicine ; and the home of ENIAC, the world's first electronic, large-scale, general-purpose digital computer in 1946. Penn is also home to the oldest continuously functioning psychology department in North America and is where the American Medical Association was founded. In 1921, Penn was also the first university to award a PhD in economics to an African-American woman, Sadie Tanner Mossell Alexander (in economics).

Motto
In 1932, all elements of the seal were revised. As part of the redesign, it was decided that the new motto "mutilated" Horace, and it was changed to its present wording, .
Penn's motto is based on a line from Horace's III.24 (Book 3, Ode 24), . From 1756 to 1898, the motto read .

Seal

The official seal of the Trustees of the University of Pennsylvania serves as the signature and symbol of authenticity on documents issued by the corporation. A request for one was first recorded in a meeting of the trustees in 1753 during which some of the Trustees "desired to get a Common Seal engraved for the Use of [the] Corporation". However, it was not until a meeting in 1756 that "a public Seal for the College with a proper device and Motto" was requested to be engraved in silver. The most recent design, a modified version of the original seal, was approved in 1932, adopted a year later and is still used for much of the same purposes as the original.

The outer ring of the current seal is inscribed with "Universitas Pennsylvaniensis", the Latin name of the University of Pennsylvania. The inside contains seven stacked books on a desk with the titles of subjects of the trivium and a modified quadrivium, components of a classical education: Theolog[ia], Astronom[ia], Philosoph[ia], Mathemat[ica], Logica, Rhetorica and Grammatica. Between the books and the outer ring is the Latin motto of the university, "Leges Sine Moribus Vanae".

Campus

Much of Penn's architecture was designed by the Philadelphia-based architecture firm Cope and Stewardson  (same architects who designed Princeton University and a large part of Washington University in St. Louis) known for having combined the Gothic architecture of the University of Oxford and University of Cambridge with the local landscape to establish the Collegiate Gothic style.

All of Penn's schools and most of its research institutes are located on this campus. The surrounding neighborhood includes several restaurants, bars, a large upscale grocery store, and movie theater on the western edge of campus. Penn's core campus borders Drexel University and is a few blocks from the University City campus of Saint Joseph's University (which absorbed University of the Sciences in Philadelphia via merger) and The Restaurant School at Walnut Hill College.

The renowned cancer research center Wistar Institute is also located on campus. In 2014, a new 7-story glass and steel building was completed next to the institute's original brick edifice built in 1897 further expanding collaboration between the university and the Wistar Institute. 

The Module 6 Utility Plant and Garage at Penn was designed by BLT Architects and completed in 1995. Module 6 is located at 38th and Walnut and includes spaces for 627 vehicles,  of storefront retail operations, a 9,500-ton chiller module and corresponding extension of the campus chilled water loop, and a 4,000-ton ice storage facility.

In 2010, in its first significant expansion across the Schuylkill River, Penn purchased  at the northwest corner of 34th Street and Grays Ferry Avenue, the then site of DuPont Marshall Research Labs. In October 2016, Penn completed the design (with help from architects Matthias Hollwich, Marc Kushner, and KSS Architects) and renovation of the center piece of the project, a former paint factory it named Pennovation Works. Pennovation Works houses shared desks, wet labs, common areas, a "pitch bleacher," and other attributes of a tech incubator. The rest of the site, which Penn is formally calling "South Bank" (of Schuylkill River), is a mixture of lightly refurbished industrial buildings that serve as affordable and flexible workspaces and land for future development. Penn hopes that "South Bank will provide a place for academics, researchers, and entrepreneurs to establish their businesses in close proximity to each other to facilitate cross-pollination of their ideas, creativity, and innovation.

Parks and arboreta
Dubbed the Postal Lands, the site extends from Market Street on the north to Penn's Bower Field on the south, including the former main regional U.S. Postal Building at 30th and Market Streets, now the regional office for the U.S. Internal Revenue Service. Over the next decade, the site became the home to educational, research, biomedical, and mixed-use facilities. The first phase, comprising a park and athletic facilities, opened in the fall of 2011.

In September 2011, Penn completed the construction of the $46.5 million,  Penn Park, which features passive and active recreation and athletic components framed and subdivided by canopy trees, lawns, and meadows. It is located east of the Highline Green and stretches from Walnut Street to South Streets.

Penn maintains two arboreta.  The roughly  The Penn Campus Arboretum at the University of Pennsylvania encompasses the entire University City campus.  The campus arboretum is an urban forest with over 6,500 trees representing 240 species of trees and shrubs, ten specialty gardens and five urban parks, which has been designated as a Tree Campus USA since 2009 and formally recognized as an accredited ArbNet Arboretum since 2017. Penn maintains an interactive website linked to Penn's comprehensive tree inventory, which allows users to explore Penn's entire collection of trees.

New Bolton Center veterinary campus
Penn also owns the  New Bolton Center, the research and large-animal health care center of its veterinary school.  Located near Kennett Square, New Bolton Center received nationwide media attention when Kentucky Derby winner Barbaro underwent surgery at its Widener Hospital for injuries suffered while running in the Preakness Stakes.

Libraries

Penn's library began in 1750 with a donation of books from cartographer Lewis Evans. Twelve years later, then-provost William Smith sailed to England to raise additional funds to increase the collection size. Benjamin Franklin was one of the libraries' earliest donors and, as a trustee, saw to it that funds were allocated for the purchase of texts from London, many of which are still part of the collection, more than 250 years later.

Penn library system has grown into a system of 14 libraries with 400 full-time equivalent (FTE) employees and a total operating budget of more than $48 million. The library system has 6.19 million book and serial volumes as well as 4.23 million microform items and 1.11 million e-books. It subscribes to over 68,000 print serials and e-journals.

Penn has the following libraries, associated by school or subject area: (1) communications library, located on campus on Walnut Street between 36th and 37th Streets in the Annenberg Communications School; (2) Biddle Law Library, located on campus on 3500 block of Sansom in the Law School; (3) The Holman Biotech Commons library, located on campus, on 3500 block of Hamilton Walk, adjacent to the Robert Wood Johnson Pavilion of the Medical School and the Nursing School; (4) chemistry library, located on campus, on 3300 block of Spruce, in the 1973 Wing of the Chemistry Building; (5) dental medicine library located on campus, on 4000 block of Locust, in Dental School; (6) fine arts library, located on campus, on 3400 block of Woodland Ave, within the Fisher Fine Arts Library; (7) Katz Center for Advanced Judaic Studies library, located off campus, at 420 Walnut Street, near Independence Hall and Washington Square; (8) humanities and social sciences library (including Weigle Information Commons) located on campus, between 34th and 35th streets on Locust Street,  within the Van Pelt-Dietrich Library Center; (9) Lea library collection of Roman Catholic Church history, located on campus, between 34th and 35th streets on Locust Street, on the 6th floor of Van Pelt-Dietrich Library Center; (10) Lippincott business library, located on campus, between 35th and 36th streets on Locust Street, in the second floor of the Van Pelt-Dietrich Library Center; (11) Math/Physics/Astronomy library, located on campus, on 3200 block of Walnut Streets, adjacent to The Palestra on the third floor of David Rittenhouse Laboratory; (12) archaeology and anthropology library within Penn Museum; (13) Rare Books and Manuscripts library (including the Yarnall Library of Theology) located on campus, between 34th and 35th streets on Locust Street, in Van Pelt-Dietrich Library Center; (14) veterinary medicine library, located on Penn Campus, between 38th and 39th streets on Sansom Street,  within the Vet School (with satellite library located off campus at New Bolton Center. Penn also maintains books and records off campus at high density storage facility.

The Penn Design School's "Fine Arts Library" was built to be Penn's main library (and first to have its own building). The then main library was designed by Frank Furness to be first library in nation to separate the low ceilings of the library stack, where the books were stored, from forty foot plus high ceilinged rooms, where the books were read and studied.

The Yarnall Library of Theology, a major American rare book collection, is part of Penn's libraries. The Yarnall Library of Theology was formerly affiliated with St. Clement's Church in Philadelphia. It was founded in 1911 under the terms of the wills of Ellis Hornor Yarnall (1839–1907) and Emily Yarnall, and subsequently housed at the former Philadelphia Divinity School. The library's major areas of focus are theology, patristics, and the liturgy, history and theology of the Anglican Communion and the Episcopal Church in the United States of America. It includes a large number of rare books, incunabula, and illuminated manuscripts, and new material continues to be added.

Art installations
The campus has more than 40 notable art installations, in part because of a 1959 Philadelphia ordinance requiring total budget for new construction or major renovation projects (where any governmental resources are used) to include 1% for art (Philadelphia's ordinance created the first such program in the country) to be used to pay for installation of site-specific public art, in part because of many alumni who collect and donate art to Penn, and in part because of the presence of the University of Pennsylvania School of Design on campus.

In 2020, Penn installed Brick House, a monumental work of art (a "critical fabulation" in language used by its creator, Simone Leigh) at the College Green gateway to Penn's campus (near corner of 34th Street and Woodland Walk).   
At the installation,  Penn president Amy Guttman proclaimed that "Ms. Leigh's sculpture brings a striking presence of strength, grace, and beauty—along with an ineffable sense of mystery and resilience—to a central crossroad of Penn's campus."

The Covenant, better known to the student body as "Dueling Tampons" or "The Tampons", is a large red structure created by Alexander Liberman and located on Locust Walk as a gateway to the high-rise residences "super block". It was installed in 1975 and is made of rolled sheets of milled steel.

A white button, known as The Button and officially called the Split Button is a modern art sculpture designed by designed by Swedish sculptor Claes Oldenburg (who specialized in creating oversize sculptures of everyday objects). It sits at the south entrance of Van Pelt Library and has button holes large enough for people to stand inside. Penn also has a replica of the Love sculpture, part of a series created by Robert Indiana. It is a painted aluminum sculpture and was installed in 1998 overlooking College Green.

In 2019, the Association for Public Art loaned Penn two multi-ton sculptures. The two works are Social Consciousness (created by Sir Jacob Epstein in 1954 and sited on the walkway between Wharton's Lippincott Library and Phi Phi chapter of Alpha Chi Rho fraternity house) and Atmosphere and Environment XII (created by Louise Nevelson in 1970, which is sited on Shoemaker Green between Franklin Field and Ringe Squash Courts).

In addition to the contemporary art, Penn also has a number of more traditional statues including a good number created by Penn's first Director of Physical Education Department, R. Tait McKenzie. Among the notable sculptures is that of Young Ben Franklin, which McKenzie produced and Penn sited adjacent to the fieldhouse contiguous to Franklin Field. The sculpture is titled Benjamin Franklin in 1723 and was created by McKenzie during the pre-World War 1 era (1910–1914). Other sculptures he produced for Penn include the 1924 sculpture of then Penn provost Edgar Fahs Smith.

Penn is presently reevaluating all of its public art and has formed a working group led by Penn Design dean Frederick Steiner, who was part of a similar effort at the University of Texas at Austin (that led to the removal of statues of Jefferson Davis and other Confederate officials), and Penn's Chief Diversity Officer, Joann Mitchell. Penn has begun the process of adding art and removing or relocating art. Penn removed from campus in 2020 the statue of the Reverend George Whitefield (who had inspired the 1740 establishment of a trust to establish a charity school, which trust Penn legally assumed in 1749) when research showed Whitefield owned fifty enslaved people and drafted and advocated for the key theological arguments in favor of slavery in Georgia and the rest of the Thirteen Colonies.

Penn Museum

Since the Penn Museum was founded in 1887, it has taken part in 400 research projects worldwide. The museum's first project was an excavation of Nippur, a location in current day Iraq.

Penn Museum is home to the largest authentic sphinx in North America at about seven feet high, four feet wide, 13 feet long, and 12.9 tons (made of solid red granite). 

The sphinx was discovered in 1912 by the British archeologist, Sir William Matthew Flinders Petrie, during an excavation of the ancient Egyptian city of Memphis, Egypt, where the sphinx had guarded a temple to ward off evil. Since Petri's expedition was partially financed by Penn Petrie offered it to Penn, which arranged for it to be moved to museum in 1913. The sphinx was moved in 2019 to a more prominent spot intended to attract visitors.

The museum has three gallery floors with artifacts from Egypt, the Middle East, Mesoamerica, Asia, the Mediterranean, Africa and indigenous artifacts of the Americas. Its most famous object is the goat rearing into the branches of a rosette-leafed plant, from the royal tombs of Ur.

The Penn Museum's excavations and collections foster a strong research base for graduate students in the Graduate Group in the Art and Archaeology of the Mediterranean World. Features of the Beaux-Arts building include a rotunda and gardens that include Egyptian papyrus.

Other Penn museums, galleries, and art collections 

Penn maintains a website providing a detailed roadmap to small museums and galleries and over one hundred locations across campus where the public can access Penn's over 8,000 artworks acquired over 250 years and includes, but is not limited to, paintings, sculptures, photography, works on paper, and decorative arts. The largest of the art galleries is the Institute of Contemporary Art, one of the only kunsthalles in the country, which showcases various art exhibitions throughout the year. Since 1983 the Arthur Ross Gallery, located at the Fisher Fine Arts Library, has housed Penn's art collection and is named for its benefactor, philanthropist Arthur Ross.

Residences

Every College House at the University of Pennsylvania has at least four members of faculty in the roles of House Dean, Faculty Master, and College House Fellows. Within the College Houses, Penn has nearly 40 themed residential programs for students with shared interests such as world cinema or science and technology. Many of the nearby homes and apartments in the area surrounding the campus are often rented by undergraduate students moving off campus after their first year, as well as by graduate and professional students.

The College Houses include W.E.B. Du Bois, Fisher Hassenfeld, Gregory, Harnwell, Harrison, Hill College House, Kings Court English, Lauder College House, Riepe, Rodin, Stouffer, and Ware.  The first College House was Van Pelt College House, established in the Fall of 1971. It was later renamed Gregory House. Fisher Hassenfeld, Ware and Riepe together make up one building called "The Quad".
 In 2019, Penn announced the construction of New College House West, which is planned to open in the fall of 2021.
Penn students in Junior or Senior year may live  in the 45 sororities and fraternities governed by three student-run governing councils, Interfraternity Council, Intercultural Greek Council, and Panhellenic Council.

Campus police
The University of Pennsylvania Police Department (UPPD) is the largest, private police department in Pennsylvania, with 117 members. All officers are sworn municipal police officers and retain general law enforcement authority while on the campus.

Academics and interdisciplinary focus

Penn's "One University Policy" allows students to enroll in classes in any of Penn's twelve schools. The College of Arts and Sciences is the undergraduate division of the School of Arts and Sciences. The School of Arts and Sciences also contains the Graduate Division and the College of Liberal and Professional Studies, which is home to the Fels Institute of Government, the master's programs in Organizational Dynamics, and the Environmental Studies (MES) program. Wharton is the business school of the University of Pennsylvania. Other schools with undergraduate programs include the School of Nursing and the School of Engineering and Applied Science (SEAS).

Penn has a strong focus on interdisciplinary learning and research. It offers double degree programs, unique majors, and academic flexibility. Penn's "One University" policy allows undergraduates access to courses at all of Penn's undergraduate and graduate schools except the medical, veterinary and dental schools. Undergraduates at Penn may also take courses at Bryn Mawr, Haverford, and Swarthmore under a reciprocal agreement known as the Quaker Consortium.

Admissions 
Undergraduate admissions to the University of Pennsylvania is considered by US News to be "most selective". Admissions officials consider a student's GPA to be a very important academic factor, with emphasis on an applicant's high school class rank and letters of recommendation.

For the class of 2026, entering in Fall 2022, the university received 54,588 applications. The Atlantic also ranked Penn among the 10 most selective schools in the country. At the graduate level, based on admission statistics from U.S. News & World Report, Penn's most selective programs include its law school, the health care schools (medicine, dental medicine, nursing, veterinary), and Wharton business school.

 SAT and ACT ranges are from the 25th to the 75th percentile.

Coordinated dual-degree, accelerated, interdisciplinary programs
Penn offers unique and specialized coordinated dual-degree (CDD) programs, which selectively award candidates degrees from multiple schools at the university upon completion of graduation criteria of both schools in addition to program-specific programs and senior capstone projects. Additionally, there are accelerated and interdisciplinary programs offered by the university. These undergraduate programs include:
 Huntsman Program in International Studies and Business
 Jerome Fisher Program in Management and Technology (M&T)
 Roy and Diana Vagelos Program in Life Sciences and Management (LSM)
 Nursing and Health Care Management (NHCM)
 Roy and Diana Vagelos Integrated Program in Energy Research (VIPER)
 Vagelos Scholars Program in Molecular Life Sciences (MLS)
 Singh Program in Networked and Social Systems Engineering (NETS)
 Digital Media Design (DMD)
 Computer and Cognitive Science
 Accelerated 7-Year Bio-Dental Program
 Accelerated 6-Year Law and Medicine Program

Dual-degree programs that lead to the same multiple degrees without participation in the specific above programs are also available. Unlike CDD programs, "dual degree" students fulfill requirements of both programs independently without the involvement of another program. Specialized dual-degree programs include Liberal Studies and Technology as well as an Artificial Intelligence: Computer and Cognitive Science Program. Both programs award a degree from the College of Arts and Sciences and a degree from the School of Engineering and Applied Sciences. Also, the Vagelos Scholars Program in Molecular Life Sciences allows its students to either double major in the sciences or submatriculate and earn both a BA and an MS in four years. The most recent Vagelos Integrated Program in Energy Research (VIPER) was first offered for the class of 2016. A joint program of Penn's School of Arts and Sciences and the School of Engineering and Applied Science, VIPER leads to dual Bachelor of Arts and Bachelor of Science in Engineering degrees by combining majors from each school.

For graduate programs, Penn offers many formalized double degree graduate degrees such as a joint J.D./MBA and maintains a list of interdisciplinary institutions, such as the Institute for Medicine and Engineering, the Joseph H. Lauder Institute for Management and International Studies, and the Institute for Research in Cognitive Science.

The University of Pennsylvania School of Social Policy and Practice, commonly known as Penn SP2, is a school of social policy and social work that offers degrees in a variety of subfields, in addition to several dual degree programs and sub-matriculation programs. Penn SP2's vision is: "The passionate pursuit of social innovation, impact and justice."

Originally named the School of Social Work, SP2 was founded in 1908 and is a graduate school of the University of Pennsylvania. The school specializes in research, education, and policy development in relation to both social and economic issues.

The School of Veterinary Medicine offers five dual-degree programs, combining the Doctor of Veterinary Medicine (VMD) with a Master of Social Work (MSW), Master of Environmental Studies (MES), Doctor of Philosophy (PhD), Master of Public Health (MPH) or Masters in Business Administration (MBA) degree. The Penn Vet dual-degree programs are meant to support veterinarians planning to engage in interdisciplinary work in the areas of human health, environmental health, and animal health and welfare.

Academic medical center and biomedical research complex

In 2018, the university's nursing school was ranked number one by Quacquarelli Symonds. That year, Quacquarelli Symonds also ranked Penn's school of Veterinary Medicine sixth. In 2019, the Perelman School of Medicine was named the third-best medical school for research in U.S. News & World Report's 2020 ranking.

The University of Pennsylvania Health System (also known as UPHS) is a multi-hospital health system headquartered in Philadelphia, Pennsylvania, owned by Trustees of University of Pennsylvania. UPHS and the Perelman School of Medicine at the University of Pennsylvania together constitute Penn Medicine, a clinical and research entity of the University of Pennsylvania. UPHS hospitals include the Hospital of the University of Pennsylvania, Penn Presbyterian Medical Center, Pennsylvania Hospital, Chester County Hospital, Lancaster General Hospital, and Princeton Medical Center. Penn Medicine owns and operates the first hospital in the United States, the Pennsylvania Hospital. It is also home to America's first surgical amphitheatre and its first medical library.

Research, innovations and discoveries

Penn is classified as an "R1" doctoral university: "Highest research activity." Its economic impact on the Commonwealth of Pennsylvania for 2015 amounted to $14.3 billion. Penn's research expenditures in the 2018 fiscal year were $1.442 billion, the fourth largest in the U.S. In fiscal year 2019 Penn received $582.3 million in funding from the National Institutes of Health.

In line with its well-known interdisciplinary tradition, Penn's research centers often span two or more disciplines. In the 2010–2011 academic year alone, five interdisciplinary research centers were created or substantially expanded; these include the Center for Health-care Financing, the Center for Global Women's Health at the Nursing School, the $13 million Morris Arboretum's Horticulture Center, the $15 million Jay H. Baker Retailing Center at Wharton and the $13 million Translational Research Center at Penn Medicine. With these additions, Penn now counts 165 research centers hosting a research community of over 4,300 faculty and over 1,100 postdoctoral fellows, 5,500 academic support staff and graduate student trainees. To further assist the advancement of interdisciplinary research President Amy Gutmann established the "Penn Integrates Knowledge" title awarded to selected Penn professors "whose research and teaching exemplify the integration of knowledge". These professors hold endowed professorships and joint appointments between Penn's schools.

Penn is also among the most prolific producers of doctoral students. With 487 PhDs awarded in 2009, Penn ranks third in the Ivy League, only behind Columbia and Cornell (Harvard did not report data). It also has one of the highest numbers of post-doctoral appointees (933 in number for 2004–2007), ranking third in the Ivy League (behind Harvard and Yale) and tenth nationally.
 
In most disciplines Penn professors' productivity is among the highest in the nation and first in the fields of epidemiology, business, communication studies, comparative literature, languages, information science, criminal justice and criminology, social sciences and sociology. According to the National Research Council nearly three-quarters of Penn's 41 assessed programs were placed in ranges including the top 10 rankings in their fields, with more than half of these in ranges including the top five rankings in these fields.

Penn's research tradition has historically been complemented by innovations that shaped higher education. In addition to establishing the first medical school, the first university teaching hospital, the oldest continuously operating degree-granting program in chemical engineering, the first business school, and the first student union, Penn was also the cradle of other significant developments. 

In 1852, Penn Law was the first law school in the nation to publish a law journal still in existence (then called The American Law Register, now the Penn Law Review, one of the most cited law journals in the world). Under the deanship of William Draper Lewis, the law school was also one of the first schools to emphasize legal teaching by full-time professors instead of practitioners, a system that is still followed today. 

The Wharton School was home to several pioneering developments in business education. It established the first research center in a business school in 1921 and the first center for entrepreneurship center in 1973 and it regularly introduced novel curricula for which BusinessWeek wrote, "Wharton is on the crest of a wave of reinvention and change in management education". The university has also contributed major advancements in the fields of economics and management. Among the many discoveries are conjoint analysis, widely used as a predictive tool especially in market research, Simon Kuznets's method of measuring Gross National Product, the Penn effect (the observation that consumer price levels in richer countries are systematically higher than in poorer ones) and the "Wharton Model" developed by Nobel-laureate Lawrence Klein to measure and forecast economic activity. The idea behind Health Maintenance Organizations also belonged to Penn professor Robert Eilers, who put it into practice during then-President Nixon's health reform in the 1970s.

Several major scientific discoveries have also taken place at Penn. The university is probably best known as the place where the first general-purpose electronic computer (ENIAC) was born in 1946 at the Moore School of Electrical Engineering. It was here also where the world's first spelling and grammar checkers were created, as well as the popular COBOL programming language. 

Penn can also boast some of the most important discoveries in the field of medicine. The dialysis machine used as an artificial replacement for lost kidney function was conceived and devised out of a pressure cooker by William Inouye while he was still a student at Penn Med; the Rubella and Hepatitis B vaccines were developed at Penn; the discovery of cancer's link with genes, cognitive therapy, Retin-A (the cream used to treat acne), Resistin, the Philadelphia gene (linked to chronic myelogenous leukemia) and the technology behind PET Scans were all discovered by Penn Med researchers. More recent gene research has led to the discovery of the (a) genes for fragile X syndrome, the most common form of inherited mental retardation; (b) spinal and bulbar muscular atrophy, a disorder marked by progressive muscle wasting; (c) Charcot–Marie–Tooth disease, a progressive neurodegenerative disease that affects the hands, feet and limbs; and (d)
genetically engineered T cells used to treat lymphoblastic leukemia and refractory diffuse large B cell lymphoma. Another contribution to medicine was made by Ralph L. Brinster (Penn faculty member since 1965) who developed the scientific basis for in vitro fertilization and the transgenic mouse at Penn and was awarded the National Medal of Science in 2010.

Penn professors Alan J. Heeger, Alan MacDiarmid and Hideki Shirakawa, Alan J. Heeger, Alan MacDiarmid and Hideki Shirakawa invented conductive polymer process that earned them the Nobel Prize in Chemistry. The theory of superconductivity was also partly developed at Penn, by then-faculty member John Robert Schrieffer (along with John Bardeen and Leon Cooper).

Academic profile and rankings

International partnerships 
Students can study abroad for a semester or a year at partner institutions such as the London School of Economics, University of Edinburgh, Chinese University of Hong Kong, University of Melbourne, Sciences Po, University of Queensland, University College London, King's College London, Hebrew University of Jerusalem and ETH Zurich.

Rankings

U.S. News & World Reports 2022 rankings place Penn seventh among national universities in the United States and Center for World University Rankings' ("CWUR") 2020/2021 survey also ranks Penn as the eighth best university in the world. The Princeton Review included Penn in its Dream Colleges list in 2015. As reported by USA Today, Penn was ranked first in the United States by College Factual for 2015.

In their 2021 edition, Penn was ranked tenth in the nation by QS (Quacquarelli Symonds). In the 2020 edition, Penn was ranked 15th in the world by the QS World University Rankings and in 2019, 17th by the Academic Ranking of World Universities (ARWU) and 12th by the Times Higher Education World University Rankings. In 2019, it ranked 12th among the universities around the world by SCImago Institutions Rankings. According to the 2015 ARWU ranking, Penn is also the eighth- and ninth-best university in the world for economics/business and social sciences studies, respectively. University of Pennsylvania ranked 12th among 300 Best World Universities in 2012 compiled by Human Resources & Labor Review (HRLR) on Measurements of World's Top 300 Universities Graduates' Performance.

The Center for Measuring University Performance places Penn in the first tier of the United States' top research universities (tied with Columbia, MIT and Stanford), based on research expenditures, faculty awards, PhD granted and other academic criteria. Penn was also ranked 18th of all U.S. colleges and universities in terms of R&D expenditures in fiscal year 2013 by the National Science Foundation. The High Impact Universities research performance index ranks Penn eighth in the world, whereas the 2010 Performance Ranking of Scientific Papers for World Universities (published by the Higher Education Evaluation and Accreditation Council of Taiwan) ranks Penn 11th in the world for 2007, 2008 and 2010 and ninth for 2009.

The Performance Ranking of Scientific Papers measures universities' research productivity, research impact, and research excellence based on the scientific papers published by their academic staff. The SCImago Institutions Rankings World Report 2012, which ranks world universities, national institutions and academies in terms of research output, ranks Penn seventh nationally among U.S. universities (2nd in the Ivy League behind Harvard) and 28th in the world overall (the first being France's Centre National de la Recherche Scientifique).

The Mines ParisTech International Professional Ranking, which ranks universities on the basis of the number of alumni listed among CEOs in the 500 largest worldwide companies, ranks Penn 11th worldwide and second nationally behind Harvard. According to a U.S. News article in 2010, Penn is tied for second (tied with Dartmouth College and Tufts University) for the number of undergraduate alumni who are current Fortune 100 CEOs. Forbes ranked Penn 17th, based on a variety of criteria. In 2022, Poets & Quants ranked the undergraduate Wharton business school as the top business school in the nation for the fifth year in a row.

Graduate and professional programs
Among its professional schools, the school of education was ranked number one in 2021 and Wharton School of Business was ranked number one in 2022, the communication, dentistry, medicine, nursing, and veterinary medicine schools rank in the top 5 nationally. Penn's Law School was ranked number 6 in 2022 and Design school, and its School of Social Policy and Practice are ranked in the top 10 In the 2010 QS Global 200 Business Schools Report, Penn was ranked second in North America.

Student life

Demographics and diversity

Jonathan and Philip Gayienquitioga, two brothers of the Mohawk Nation, were recruited by Benjamin Franklin to attend the Academy of Philadelphia, making them the first Native Americans at Penn when they enrolled in 1755. Moses Levy, the first Jewish student, enrolled in 1769 (and was also elected Penn's first Jewish trustee in 1802, serving to 1826). Joseph M. Urquiola (aka José María de Urquiola y Fernández de Zúñiga), School of Medicine class of 1829 was the first Latino (from Cuba) and Auxencio Maria Pena, School of Medicine class of 1836, was the first South American (from Venezuela) to graduate from Penn.

William Adger, James Brister, and Nathan Francis Mossell in 1879 were the first African Americans to enroll at Penn. Adger was the first African American to graduate from the college at Penn (1883), and when Brister graduated from the School of Dental Medicine (Penn Dental) (class of 1881), he was the first African American to earn a degree at Penn. Mossell was first African American to graduate from Penn Med (1882) (and had a brother, Aaron Albert Mossell II who was the first African American graduate of University of Pennsylvania Law School (in 1888)

and  niece, Sadie Tanner Mossell Alexander, Albert's daughter, who not only was first African American woman to graduate from Penn Law (in 1927) and be admitted to practice law in Pennsylvania, but prior to such noteworthy accomplishments was the first African American woman to earn a PhD in the United States (from Penn in 1922)). Sadie Tanner Mossell Alexander's uncle (via her mother's Tanner family), Lewis Baxter Moore, in 1896 became the first person of African descent to earn a doctorate at the University of Pennsylvania and only the fifth black person in the United States to earn a doctor of philosophy degree and in 1899 founded the Teachers College (now known as the School of Education) of Howard University and served as its dean continuously from 1899 through September 1920.

Tosui Imadate was the first person of Asian descent to graduate from Penn (College  Class of 1879). In 1877, Imadate became the first Asian member of a fraternity at Penn when he became a brother at Phi Kappa Psi. In a quote from a portion of a letter published in December 1880 issue of The Crescent, Imadate is described by a Phi Kappa Psi brother as a "brother member of Penn's I [iota] chapter of Phi Kappa Psi Fraternity, who is a professor in college at Kiota [(Kyoto, Japan)]". 

Fuji Tsukamoto (Penn Graduate School Class of 1889) became the first woman of Asian descent to matriculate at Penn when she started her study of biology and botany in 1885 and, like Tosui Imadate, also taught at Kyoto college in Japan.

Mary Alice Bennett, MD, PhD, and Anna H. Johnson were in 1880 the first women to enroll in a Penn degree-granting program and Bennett was the first woman to receive a degree from Penn, which was a PhD.

Julian Abele ("Willing and Able" to his fellow students) in 1902 was the first African American to graduate from University of Pennsylvania School of Design (then named Department of Architecture) and was elected as the president of Penn's Architectural Society. Abele won a 1901 student competition where he designed a Beaux Arts pedestrian gateway that was built and still stands on the campus of Haverford College, The Edward B. Conklin Memorial Gate at the Railroad Avenue entrance to Haverford College. Abele contributed to the design of more than 400 buildings, including the Widener Memorial Library at Harvard University (1912–1915), Philadelphia's Central Library (1917–1927), and the Philadelphia Museum of Art (1914–1928). and was the primary designer of the west campus of Duke University (1924–1954). Duke honored Abele by prominently displaying his portrait, the first portrait of an African American to be displayed on the campus.

Sadie Tanner Mossell Alexander (paternal niece of Nathan Francis Mossell and maternal niece of Lewis Baxter Moore) was the first African American to receive a PhD in economics in the United States (and third black woman to earn one in the United States in any subject) and first from Penn in 1921, the first African-American woman to receive a law degree from Penn Law in 1927, and the first African-American woman to practice law in Pennsylvania.

Alan L. Hart, MD, who earned a master's degree at Penn Med in radiology (class of 1928), was born in 1890 and publicly identified as a female, Alberta Lucille Hart, through much of 1917, the year Dr. Hart transitioned to being a man by having a hysterectomy, one of the first in the United States to be performed to help a person become a trans man, and lived the rest of his life as a man. Dr. Hart, Penn's most prominent transgender alumnus in the first half of the twentieth century, was a pioneer in using x-ray photography to detect tuberculosis, allowing the identification of asymptomatic TB carriers (seventy-five percent of the total infected), permitting treatment of patients before they had complications, and allowing for separation of TB patients from others to stop the spread of one of the more infectious deadly diseases known to humanity.

The first openly LGBTQ+ organization funded by Penn was formed in 1972 by "Steve" Kiyoshi Kuromiya (a Benjamin Franklin Scholar and Penn alumnus from the College's class of 1966) when he created the Gay Coffee Hour, which met every week on campus and was also open to non-students and served as an alternative space to gay bars for gay people of all ages. Penn funded the Gay Coffee House program (via a grant from the student government), which was held in Houston Hall at six o'clock in the evening every Wednesday and attracted, on average, roughly sixty people of all ages with roughly "one-quarter to one-third women and two-thirds to three-quarters men."  In March 2023, Penn announced a first in the United States LGBTQ+ scholar in residence after a $2-million gift.  

As detailed in part above, by the first decades of the twentieth century, Penn made strides and took an active interest in attracting diverse students from around the globe. Two examples of such action occurred in 1910. Penn's first director of publicity, created a recruiting brochure, translated into Spanish, with approximately 10,000 copies circulated throughout Latin America. That same year, the Penn-affiliated organization, the Cosmopolitan Club, started an annual tradition of hosting an opening "smoker", which attracted students from 40 nations who were formally welcomed to the university by then-vice provost Edgar Fahs Smith (who the following year would start a ten-year tenure as provost) who spoke about how Penn wanted to "bring together students of different countries and break down misunderstandings existing between them".

The success of such efforts were reported in 1921 when the official Penn publicity department reported that

Of those accepted for admission in 2018, 48 percent were Asian, Hispanic, African-American or Native American. Fourteen percent of entering undergraduates in 2018 were international students. The composition of international first-year students in 2018 was: 46% from Asia; 15% from Africa and the Middle East; 16% from Europe; 14% from Canada and Mexico; 8% from the Caribbean, Central America and South America; 5% from Australia and the Pacific Islands. The acceptance rate for international students admission in 2018 was 493 out of 8,316 (6.7%). In 2018, 55% of all enrolled students were women.

In the last few decades, Jewish enrollment has been declining. Circa 1999 about 28% of the students were Jewish. In early 2020, 1,750 Penn undergraduate students were Jewish, which would be approximately 17% of the some 10,000 undergrads for 2019–20.

Penn Face and behavioral health
The university's social pressure surrounding academic perfection, extreme competitiveness, and nonguaranteed readmission have created what is known as "Penn Face": students put on a façade of confidence and happiness while enduring mental turmoil. Stanford University calls this phenomenon "Duck Syndrome." In recent years, mental health has become an issue on campus with ten student suicides between the years of 2013 to 2016. The school responded by launching a task force. The most widely covered case of Penn Face has been Madison Holleran. In 2018, initiatives were enacted to ameliorate mental health problems, such as requiring sophomores to live on campus and the daily closing of Huntsman Hall at 2:00 a.m. The university's suicide rate was the catalyst for a 2018 state bill, introduced by Governor Tom Wolf, to raise Pennsylvania's standards for university suicide prevention. The university's efforts to address mental health on campus came into the national spotlight again in September 2019 when the director of the university's counseling services died by suicide six months after starting the position.

Selected student organizations
Oldest organization

The Philomathean Society, founded in 1813, is one of the United States' oldest collegiate literary societies and continues to host lectures and intellectual events open to the public.

The Daily Pennsylvanian

The Daily Pennsylvanian is an independent, student-run newspaper, which has been published daily since it was founded in 1885. The newspaper went unpublished from May 1943 to November 1945 due to World War II. In 1984, the university lost all editorial and financial control of The Daily Pennsylvanian (also known as The DP) when the newspaper became its own corporation. The Daily Pennsylvanian has won the Pacemaker Award administered by the Associated Collegiate Press multiple times, most recently in 2019. The DP also publishes a weekly arts and culture magazine called 34th Street Magazine.
 The DP also operates three principal websites—thedp.com, 34st.com, and underthebutton.com—as well as a variety of opinion, news, and sports blogs. It has received various collegiate journalism awards.

Academic organizations

The Penn Debate Society (PDS), founded in 1984 as the Penn Parliamentary Debate Society, is Penn's debate team, which competes regularly on the American Parliamentary Debate Association and the international British Parliamentary circuit.

The Penn History Review is a journal, published twice a year, through the Department of History, for undergraduate historical research, by and for undergraduates, and founded in 1991.

LGBTQ+ organizations
Penn has been ranked as the number one LGBTQ+ friendly school in the country. Penn's LGBTQ+ center is second oldest in the nation and oldest in Commonwealth of Pennsylvania as it has been serving the LGBTQ+ community since 1979 by providing support and guidance through 25 groups (including Penn J-Bagel a Jewish LGBTQ+ group, the Lambda Alliance a general LGBTQ social organization, and oSTEM a group for LGBTQ people in STEM fields). Penn offers courses in Sexuality and Gender Studies which allows students to discover and learn queer theory, history of sexual norms, and other gender orientation related courses. The first Penn funded LGBTQ+ organization was formed in 1972 by "Steve" Kiyoshi Kuromiya (Penn college class of 1966) when he created the Gay Coffee Hour, which met every week on campus and served as an alternative space to gay bars for gay people of all ages. Penn funded the Gay Coffee House via a grant from the student government and the weekly event was held in Houston Hall Wednesday evenings.

Penn Electric Racing 

Penn Electric Racing is the university's Formula SAE team that competes in the international FSAE EV competition (Formula Society of Automotive Engineers, Electric Vehicle). Colloquially known as "PER", the team designs, manufactures, and races custom Formula-style electric racecars against other collegiate teams. In 2015, PER built and raced their first racecar, REV1, at the Lincoln Nebraska FSAE competition, winning first place. The team repeated their success with their next two racecars: REV2 won second place in 2016, and REV3 won first place in 2017.

Performing arts organizations
Penn is home to numerous organizations that promote the arts, from dance to spoken word, jazz to stand-up comedy, theatre, a cappella and more. The Performing Arts Council (PAC) oversees 45 student organizations in these areas. The PAC has four subcommittees: A Cappella Council; Dance Arts Council; Singer, Musicians, and Comedians (SMAC); and Theatre Arts Council (TAC-e).

Penn Glee Club

The University of Pennsylvania Glee Club, founded in 1862, is tied for fourth oldest continually running glee clubs in the United States and the oldest performing arts group at the University of Pennsylvania. Each year, the Penn Glee Club writes and produces a fully staged, Broadway-style production with an eclectic mix of Penn standards, Broadway classics, classical favorites, and pop hits, highlighting choral singing from all genders (as of April 9, 2021, it merged with Penn Sirens, a previously all female chorale group), clever plots and dialogue, dancing, humor, colorful sets and costumes, and a pit band. The Glee Club draws its singing members from the undergraduate and graduate students (and men and women from the Penn community are also called upon to fill roles in the pit band and technical staff when the club is involved with theatrical productions). The Penn Glee Club has traveled to nearly all 50 states in the United States and over 40 nations and territories on five continents. Since the 1950s, Penn Glee Club has appeared on national television with such celebrities as Bob Hope, Frank Sinatra, Jimmy Stewart, Ed McMahon, Carol Lawrence, and Princess Grace Kelly of Monaco and has been showcased on television specials such as the Macy's Thanksgiving Day Parade, and at professional sporting events for The Philadelphia Phillies where club sung the National Anthem at the 1993 National League Championship Series. Since its first performance at the White House for President Calvin Coolidge in 1926, the club has sung for numerous heads of state and world leaders. One of the highlights of 1989 was the club's performance for Polish President Lech Wałęsa. Bruce Montgomery, its best-known and longest-serving director, led the club from 1956 until 2000.

Penn Band

The University of Pennsylvania Band has been a part of student life since 1897. The Penn Band presently mainly performs at football and basketball games as well as university functions (e.g. commencement and convocation) throughout the year but in past it was known not only as the first college band to perform at Macy's Thanksgiving Day Parade but performed with notable musicians, including John Philip Sousa, members of the Philadelphia Orchestra, the U.S. Marine Band ("The President's Own"), Doc Severinsen of The Tonight Show Starring Johnny Carson. Beginning in the late 1920s and 1930s Penn Band recorded with the Victor Talking Machine Company (RCA-Victor Company) and was nationally broadcast on WABC (AM). In 1977, Penn Band performed with Chuck Barris of The Gong Show and in 1980 opened for Penn Alumnus, Maury Povich in his eponymously named show.

Penn Band has performed for Princess Grace Kelly of Monaco (sister and aunt to number of alumni), alumnus and District Attorney and Mayor of Philadelphia, and Governor of Pennsylvania Ed Rendell, Vice President Al Gore, Presidents Theodore Roosevelt, Lyndon B. Johnson and Ronald Reagan, and Polish dissident and President Lech Wałęsa. By the 1970s, however, Penn Band had begun moving away from the traditional corps style and is now a scramble band.  The first one hundred years of the organization's history was described in a book from Arcadia Publishing: Images of America:The University of Pennsylvania Band (2006).

Penn's a cappella community

The A Cappella Council (ACK) is composed of 14 a cappella groups. Penn's a cappella groups entertain audiences with repertoires including pop, rock, R&B, jazz, Hindi, and Chinese songs. ACK is also home to Off The Beat, which has received the most contemporary a cappella recording awards of any collegiate group in the United States and the most features on the Best of College A Cappella albums. Penn Masala, formed in 1996, is world's oldest and premier South Asian a cappella group based in an American university, which has performed for Barack Obama, Henry Kissinger, Ban Ki Moon, Farooq Abdullah, Imran Khan, Rajkumar Hirani, A.R. Rahman, and Sunidhi Chauhan, had their a cappella version of Nazia Hassan's Urdu classic "Aap Jaisa Koi", (originally from the movie Qurbani) sung in the movie American Desi, and was invited by Penn alumni Elizabeth Banks (class of 1996) and Max Handelman (Banks' husband, class of 1995) to appear in Pitch Perfect 2, as Banks reported that Penn's a capella community inspired the film series starring and/or produced by Banks and Handleman.

Comedy organizations
Mask and Wig, a club founded in 1889, is the oldest all-male musical comedy troupe in the country. Bloomers comedy group, founded in 1978, was the "... nation's first collegiate all-women musical and sketch comedy troupe..." and now accepts all persons from under-represented gender identities who perform comedy.

Religious and spiritual organizations

Mainstream Protestantism
Dating back to 1857, The Christian Association (a.k.a. The CA) is the oldest religious organization at the university and is composed primarily of students from Mainline Protestant backgrounds. When the university moved to its current campus in the 1880s the CA was based in Houston Hall. After moving around several times it relocated to building at 36th and Locust Streets, which it built and owned (now the ARCH Building), and occupied from 1928 until 2000. The CA ran several foreign missions including one of lasting import when in 1906 it financed University of Pennsylvania School of Medicine graduate, Josiah McCracken, MD, trip to China to investigate the viability of operating the medical department of the Canton Christian College (now known as Lingnan University (Guangzhou)). The following year, Dr. McCracken moved to China and renamed the department as "The University Medical School in Canton, China," and served as its president from the time of renaming through the date in 1913 when the CA ended its affiliation with the Canton Christian College. The CA
also ran for decades a camp for socio-economically disadvantaged children from Philadelphia in a more rural section of Pennsylvania. At present the CA occupies part of the parsonage at Tabernacle United Church of Christ.

Judaism
Though Moses Levy, Penn's first Jewish student, enrolled in 1772 and was the first Jewish trustee (elected in 1802 and served through 1826), organized Jewish life did not begin in earnest until the start of 20th century. Jewish Life on campus is centered at Penn branch of Hillel International, which inspires students to explore Judaism, creates patterns of Jewish living that can be sustained after graduation, provides religious communities, promotes educational initiatives, social justice projects, social and cultural opportunities, and groups focusing on Israel education and politics, and hosts a Kosher Penn  approved dining hall (supervised by the Community Kashrus of Greater Philadelphia). In addition Penn Hillel student and professional staff help  facilitate the Rohr Jewish Learning Institute's Sinai Scholars Society Academic Symposium, a prestigious event that brings together Jewish college students with noted Jewish academics for a day of in-depth discussion and debate at the university.

Roman Catholicism
The Penn Newman Catholic Center (the Newman Center) was founded in 1893 (and was the first Newman Center in the country) with the mission of supporting students, faculty, and staff in their religious endeavors. The organization brings prominent Christian figures to campus, including Rev. Thomas "Tom" J. Hagan, OSFS, who worked in the Newman Center and founded Haiti-based non-profit Hands Together; and, in September 2015, James Martin SJ (Wharton undergraduate class of 1982). In addition to his duties as a Jesuit priest, Father Martin is an  editor-at-large of the Jesuit magazine America, a New York Times Best Selling author, and frequent commentator on the life and teachings of Jesus and on Ignatian spirituality. Father Martin is especially well known for his outreach to the LGBT community, which has drawn a strong backlash from parts of the Catholic Church, but has provided comfort to Penn students and other members of Roman Catholic community who wish to stay connected with their faith and identify as LGBQT. During the 2015 World Meetings of Families, which included a visit from Pope Francis to Philadelphia, the Newman Center hosted over 900 Penn students and alumni.

Hinduism and Jainism
University of Pennsylvania funds (via the Graduate and Professional Student Assembly or similar undergraduate organization) a variety of official clubs focused on India including a number focused on students who are Hindu or Jain.

Islam
In 1963, the Muslim Students' Association (MSA National) and Penn chapter of MSA National were founded to facilitate Muslim life among students on college campuses. The University of Pennsylvania chapter (Penn MSA) was established to help Penn Muslims build faith and community by fostering a space under the guidance of Islamic principles. In 1973, Penn MSA helped found Masjid Al-Jamia, a mosque close to campus, to facilitate Penn's and the local community's easy access to Islamic study circles, social events, Friday prayers and holiday celebrations. The establishment of the mosque and the 1980 organization of a relief fund to aid refugees fleeing Afghanistan in the wake of the Soviet attack are consistent with Penn MSA support of mission of its related umbrella organization, Islamic Society of North America, to "foster the development of the Muslim community, interfaith relations, civic engagement, and better understandings of Islam." Though Penn MSA stakeholders remain involved with Masjid Al-Jamia mosque, the local West Philadelphia community now operates the mosque, which, as of 2009, is owned by a national organization, North American Islamic Trust, Inc. In addition to Penn MSA support of Islam at Penn, The Muslim Life Program at the University of Pennsylvania provides such support and helped cause Penn (in January 2017) to hire its first full-time Muslim chaplain, the co-president of the Association of Campus Muslim Chaplains, Sister Patricia Anton (whose background includes working with Muslim, interfaith, academic and peace-building institutions such as Islamic Society of North America and Islamic Relief). Chaplain Anton's mandate includes supporting and guiding the Penn Muslim community to foster further development of such community by creating a welcoming environment that provides Penn Muslim community opportunities to intellectually and spiritually engage with Islam. Penn also has a residential house, the Muslim Life Residential Program, which provides Penn students with a live/learn environment focused on the appreciation of Islamic culture, food, history, and practice, and shows its residents how Islam is deeply integrated in the culture of Philadelphia  so they may appreciate how Islam influences daily life in the home of one of the largest Muslim communities in North America.

Athletics

Penn's sports teams are nicknamed the Quakers, but the teams are often also referred to as The Red and Blue as reflected in the popular song sung after every athletic contest where the Penn Band or other musical groups are present. The athletes participate in the Ivy League and Division I (Division I FCS for football) in the NCAA. In recent decades, they often have been league champions in football (14 times from 1982 to 2010) and basketball (22 times from 1970 to 2006). The first athletic team at Penn was the cricket team, which formed in 1842 and played regularly through 1846, the year it lost its "grounds", and then  only played intermittently until 1864, the year it played its first intercollegiate game (against Haverford College). The rowing (or crew) team composed of Penn students but not officially representing Penn was formed in 1854 but did not compete against other colleges as official part of Penn until 1879. The rugby football team began to play against other colleges, most notably against College of New Jersey (now Princeton University) in 1874 using a combination of association football (i.e. soccer) and rugby rules (the twenty players on each side were able to use their hands but were not able to pass or bat the ball forward).

Cricket
The first University of Pennsylvania cricket team, reported to be the first cricket team in the United States composed exclusively of Americans, was organized in 1842 by a member of Philadelphia's prominent Wister family, William Rotch Wister (class of 1846 for Bachelor of Arts and 1849 for Master of Arts). Penn never possessed its own "ground" except in 1846 when it leased one day a week, for a total sum of $50, a "ground" (located east of the Delaware River). From 1846 to 1860, there is little evidence of Penn playing cricket but just as Civil War began, Penn students resumed playing cricket matches between classes of Penn students.

On May 7, 1864, Penn played its first intercollegiate game against Haverford College and then proceeded to play Haverford for three consecutive years until 1869, when the Haverford faculty banned cricket away from their college grounds.

After Penn moved west of the Schuylkill River in 1872, Penn played cricket at one of the local clubs (Belmont Cricket Club, the closest to campus at 50th Street and Chester Avenue, Merion Cricket Club, and Germantown Cricket Club), or at Haverford College. Though there is evidence of an occasional game during period 1870 through 1875, none were played against other colleges and there were no yearbook pictures for the three years after 1872 when Penn moved from Center City to University City. Starting in 1875 and through 1880, Penn fielded a varsity eleven, which played a few matches each year against opponents that  included Haverford College and Columbia College.

In 1881, Penn, Harvard College, Haverford College, Princeton College (then known as College of New Jersey), and Columbia College formed The Intercollegiate Cricket Association, which Cornell University later joined. Penn won The Intercollegiate Cricket Association championship (the de facto national championship) 23 times (18 solo, 3 shared with Haverford and Harvard, 1 shared with Haverford and Cornell, and 1 shared with just Haverford) during the 44 years that The Intercollegiate Cricket Association existed (1881 through 1924).

In the 1890s Penn's cricket team frequently toured Canada and the British Isles. In July 1895 an international cricket match between Canada and the United States was played on the Manheim grounds in Germantown section of Philadelphia with six of the United States team being Penn student athletes and, in September of that year, past and then current members of Penn's varsity cricket team played past and then current members of the English cricket teams of Oxford and Cambridge resulting in Penn defeating the Oxford-Cambridge team by one hundred runs. This was not surprising as in the last two and a half decades of the 19th century and first decade of the 20th century, Philadelphia was the center of cricket in the United States 

Cricket had gained in popularity among the upper class from their travels abroad and cricket clubs sprung up all across the Eastern Seaboard (even today Philadelphia still has three cricket clubs: the Philadelphia Cricket Club, the Merion Cricket Club, and the Germantown Cricket Club).

Perhaps the university's most famous cricket player was George Patterson (class of 1888), who still holds the North American batting record and who went on to play for the professional Philadelphia Cricket Team.

Following the First World War, cricket began to experience a serious decline (as baseball became the preferred sport of the warmer months and Imperial Cricket Conference, Cricket's "... international governing body and forerunner to the current International Cricket Conference (ICC), introduced a regulation making it clear that only countries within the British empire were welcome to compete") such that in 1924 Penn fielded its last team in the twentieth century. Starting in 2009, however, Penn once again fielded a cricket team, albeit club, that ended up being the first winner of a tournament for teams from the Ivies.

Rowing 

Rowing (crew) at Penn dates back to at least 1854 with the founding of the University Barge Club. The university currently hosts both heavyweight and lightweight men's teams and an open weight women's team, all of which compete as part of the Eastern Sprints League. Ellis Ward was Penn's first intercollegiate crew coach from 1879 through 1912. During the course of Ward's coaching career at Penn his "... Red and Blue crews won 65 races, in about 150 starts." Importantly, Ward coached Penn's 8-oared boat to the finals of the Grand Challenge Cup (the oldest and most prized trophy) at the Henley Royal Regatta (but in that final race was defeated by the champion Leander Club).

Penn Rowing has produced a long list of famous coaches and Olympians. Members of Penn crew team, rowers Sidney Jellinek, Eddie Mitchell, and coxswain, John G. Kennedy, won the bronze medal for the United States at 1924 Olympics.

Joe Burk (class of 1935) was captain of Penn crew team, winner of the Henley Diamond Sculls twice, named recipient of the James E. Sullivan Award for nation's best amateur athlete in 1939, and Penn coach from 1950 to 1969. The 1955 Men's Heavyweight 8, coached by Joe Burk, became one of only four American university crews in history to win the Grand Challenge Cup at the Henley Royal Regatta. The outbreak of World War Two canceled the 1940 Olympics for which Burk was favored to win the gold medal.

Other Penn Olympic athletes and or Penn coaches of such athletes include:
(a) John Anthony Pescatore (who competed in the 1988 Seoul Olympic Games for the United States as stroke of the men's coxed eight which earned a bronze medal and later competed at the 1992 Barcelona Olympic Games in the men's coxless pair),
(b) Susan Francia (winner of gold medals as part of the women's 8 oared boat at 2008 Olympics and 2012 Olympics),
(c) Regina Salmons (member of 2021 USA team), 
(d) Rusty Callow, 
(e) Harry Parker,
(f) Ted Nash, and
(g) John B. Kelly Jr., son of John B. Kelly Sr. (winner of three medals at 1920 Summer Olympics) and brother of Princess Grace of Monaco, was the second Penn Crew alumnus to win the James E. Sullivan Award for being nation's best amateur athlete (in 1947), who was winner of a bronze medal at the 1956 Summer Olympics).

The Penn men's crew team won the National Collegiate Rowing Championship in 1991. A member of that team, Janusz Hooker (Wharton class of 1992) won the bronze medal in Men's Quadruple Sculls for Australia at the 1996 Summer Olympics. The Penn teams presently row out of College Boat Club, No.11 Boathouse Row.

Rugby

The Penn men's rugby football team is one of the oldest collegiate rugby teams in the United States.  Indeed, Penn first fielded a team in mid 1870s playing by rules much closer to the rugby union and Association Football code rules (relative to American football rules, as such American football rules had not yet been invented). Among its earliest games was a game against College of New Jersey (which in 1895 changed its name to Princeton) played in Philadelphia on Saturday, November 11, 1876, which was less than two weeks before Princeton met on November 23, 1876, with Harvard and Columbia to confirm that all their games would be played using the rugby union rules. Princeton and Penn played their November 1876 game per a combination of rugby (there were 20 players per side and players were able to touch the ball with their hands) and Association Football codes. The rugby code influence was due, in part, to the fact that some of their students had been educated in English public schools.

Among the prominent alumni to play in a 19th-century version of rugby (rules that did not allow forward passes or center snaps) was John Heisman, namesake of the Heisman Trophy and an 1892 graduate of the University of Pennsylvania Law School.

Heisman was instrumental in the first decade of the 20th century in changing the rules to more closely relate to the present rules of American football. One of Heisman's teammates (who was unanimously voted Captain in the fall after Heisman graduated) was Harry Arista Mackey, Penn Law class of 1893 (who subsequently served as Mayor of Philadelphia from 1928 to 1932).

In 1906, Rugby per Rugby Union code was reintroduced to Penn (as Penn last played per Rugby Union Code in 1882 as Penn played rugby per a number of different rugby football rulebooks and codes from 1883 through 1890s) by Frank Villeneuve Nicholson (Frank Nicholson (rugby union)) University of Pennsylvania School of Dental Medicine (class of 1910), who in 1904 had captained the Australian national rugby team in its match against England. 

Penn played per rugby union code rules at least through 1912, contemporaneously with Penn playing American gridiron football. Evidence of such may be found in an October 22, 1910, Daily Pennsylvanian article (quoted below) and a yearbook photo that rugby per rugby union code was played.

The player-coach of United States Olympic gold-winning rugby team at the 1924 Summer Olympics was Alan Valentine, who played rugby while at Penn (which he attended during 1921/1922 academic year) as he was getting a master's degree at Wharton.

Though Penn played rugby per rugby union rules from 1929 through 1934, there is no indication that Penn had a rugby team from 1935 through 1959 when Penn men's rugby became permanent due to leadership of Harry "Joe" Edwin Reagan III Penn's College class of 1962 and Penn Law class of 1965, who also went onto help create and incorporate (in 1975) and was Treasurer (in 1981) of USA Rugby and Oreste P. "Rusty" D'Arconte Penn's College class of 1966 Thus, with D'Arconte's hustle and Reagan's charisma and organizational skills, a team, which had fielded a side of fifteen intermittently from 1912 through 1960, became permanent.

In spring of 1984 Penn women's rugby, led by Social Chair Tamara Wayland (College class of 1985 who subsequently became the women's representative to and vice president of USA Rugby South from 1996 to 1998), Club President Marianne Seligson, and Penn Law student Gigi Sohn, began to compete. Penn women's rugby team is coached, as of 2020, by (a) Adam Dick, a 300-level certified coach with over 15 years of rugby coaching experience including being the first coach of the first women's rugby team at the University of Arizona and who was a four-year starter at University of Arizona men's first XV rugby team and (b) Philly women's player Kate Hallinan.

Penn's men's rugby team plays in the Ivy Rugby Conference and have finished as runners-up in both 15s and 7s in the Conference and won the Ivy Rugby Tournament in 1992. , the club uses the state-of-the-art facilities at Penn Park. The Penn Quakers' rugby team played on national TV at the 2013 Collegiate Rugby Championship, a college rugby tournament that for number of years had been played each June at PPL Park (now known as Subaru Park) in Philadelphia and was broadcast live on NBC. In their inaugural year of participation, the Penn men's rugby team won the Shield Competition, beating local Big Five rival, Temple University, 17–12 in the final. In the semifinal match of that Shield Competition, Penn Rugby became the first Philadelphia team to beat a non-Philadelphia team in CRC history, with a 14–12 win over the University of Texas.

Penn men's rugby, as of 2020, is coached by Tiger Bax, a former professional rugby player hailing from Cape Town, South Africa, whose playing experience includes stints in the Super Rugby competition with the Stormers (15s) and Mighty Mohicans (7s), as well as with the Gallagher Premiership Rugby side, Saracens and whose coaching experience includes three successful years as coach at Valley Rugby Football Club in Hong Kong; and Tyler May, from Cherry Hill, New Jersey, who played rugby at Pennsylvania State University where he was a first XV player for three years.

Players on the 2019 men's team came from 11 countries: Australia, Botswana, Chile, Great Britain, Malaysia, Netherlands, New Zealand, China, Taiwan, South Africa, and the United States).

Penn's graduate business and law schools also fielded rugby teams. The Wharton rugby team has competed from 1978 to the present. The Penn Law Rugby team (1985 through 1993) counts among its alumni Walter Joseph Jay Clayton, III Penn Law class of 1993, and chair of the U.S. Securities and Exchange Commission from May 4, 2017, until December 23, 2020, Raymond Hulser, former Chief of Public Integrity Section of United States Department of Justice, and Magistrate Judge Bruce Reinhart who approved the search of Mar-a-Lago, the residence of former U.S. president Donald Trump in Palm Beach, Florida.  Other recent Penn Rugby Alumni include Conor Lamb (Penn College class of 2006 and Penn Law class of 2009), who played for undergraduate team (and had an additional year of eligibility allowing him to continue to playing for undergraduate team while a student at Penn Law per USA Rugby rules), and, as of 2021, is a member of United States House of Representatives, elected originally to Pennsylvania's 18th congressional district, since 2019 is a U.S. Representative from Pennsylvania's 17th congressional district.

Football

Penn first fielded a football team against Princeton at the Germantown Cricket Club in Philadelphia on November 11, 1876.

Penn football made many contributions to the sport in its early days. During the 1890s, Penn's famed coach and alumnus George Washington Woodruff introduced the quarterback kick, a forerunner of the forward pass, as well as the place-kick from scrimmage and the delayed pass. In 1894, 1895, 1897 and 1904, Penn was generally regarded as the national champion of collegiate football.  Among the key players on the teams from 1897 to 1900 was Truxton Hare, Sr. who was selected as a charter member of the College Football Hall of Fame in 1951. While primarily a guard, he also ran, punted, kicked off, and drop-kicked extra points.

The achievements of two of Penn's other outstanding players from that era, John Heisman, a Law School alumnus, and John Outland, a Penn Med alumnus, are remembered each year with the presentation of the Heisman Trophy to the most outstanding college football player of the year, and the Outland Trophy to the most outstanding college football interior lineman of the year.

Also, each year the Bednarik Award is given to college football's best defensive player. Chuck Bednarik (class of 1949) was a three-time All-American center/linebacker who starred on the 1947 team and is generally regarded as Penn's all-time finest. In addition to Bednarik, the 1947 squad boasted four-time All-American tackle George Savitsky and three-time All-American halfback Skip Minisi. All three standouts were subsequently elected to the College Football Hall of Fame, as was their coach, George Munger (a star running back at Penn in the early 1930s). Bednarik went on to play for 12 years with the Philadelphia Eagles, and was elected to the Pro Football Hall of Fame in 1969.

Penn's game against University of California at Berkeley on September 29, 1951 (in front of a crowd of 60,000 at Franklin Field), was first college football game to be broadcast in color.
ESPN's College GameDay traveled to Penn to highlight the Harvard–Penn game on November 17, 2002, the first time the popular college football show had visited an Ivy League campus.

Basketball

Penn basketball is steeped in tradition. Penn made its only (and the Ivy League's second) Final Four appearance in 1979, where the Quakers lost to Magic Johnson-led Michigan State in Salt Lake City. (Dartmouth twice finished second in the tournament in the 1940s, but that was before the beginning of formal League play.) Penn's team is also a member of the Philadelphia Big 5, along with La Salle, Saint Joseph's, Temple and Villanova. In 2007, the men's team won its third consecutive Ivy League title and then lost in the first round of the NCAA Tournament to Texas A&M. Penn last made the NCAA tournament in 2018 where it lost to top seeded Kansas.

Olympic athletes 

At least 43 different Penn alumni have earned 81 Olympic medals (26 gold).  Penn won more of its "medals" (which were actually cups, trophies, or plaques, as medals were not introduced until a later Olympics) at 1900 Summer Olympics held in Paris than at any other Olympics. Penn's track and field alumni who won 21 'medals' at the 1900 Paris Olympics are: (1) Alvin Kraenzlein (University of Pennsylvania School of Dental Medicine class of 1900), known as "the father of the modern hurdling technique", who  was first sportsman in the history of Olympic games to win four individual gold medals in a single discipline; (2) Josiah McCracken, MD (University of Pennsylvania School of Medicine class of 1901) who won the silver medal in the shot put and a bronze medal for the hammer throw; (3) John Walter Tewksbury (Penn Dental School class of 1899) who won five 'medals' (gold in the 200 meter dash and 400 meter hurdles, silver in the 60 meter dash and 100 meter dash, and a bronze in the 200 meter hurdles); (4) Irving Baxter (Penn Law class of 1901) who won five "medals" (gold in both the men's high jump and men's pole vault and silver in all three of the standing jumps (long, triple, and high); (5) Meredith Colket (College Class of 1901 (BS), Penn Law class of 1904) who won the silver 'medal' in the pole vault, (6) Truxton Hare (Penn Law class of 1904) who won the silver 'medal' in the hammer throw (and at 1904 Summer Olympics held in St. Louis, Missouri, won (i) bronze medal in the all-around discipline (which consisted of 100 yard run, shot put, high jump, 880 yard walk, hammer throw, pole vault, 120 yard hurdles, long jump and one mile run), and (ii) gold medal as part of United States tug of war team), and (7) George Orton (University of Pennsylvania Graduate School of Arts and Sciences class of 1894 (MA) and class of 1896 (PhD)) who (as first physically disabled Olympic athlete) won a gold 'medal' in the 2,500 meter run and a bronze metal in the 400 meter hurdles

The first African American in the United States to win an Olympic gold medal at an Olympics, the 1908 London Olympics, as part of Medley relay where he ran the third leg, the 400 meters, was John Taylor (University of Pennsylvania School of Veterinary Medicine (class of 1908)). Taylor was followed by William Hamilton and Nate Cartmell (fellow Penn athlete).

In the 2020 Summer Olympics held in Tokyo, Japan, in summer of 2021, nine Penn students and alumni played in six different sports from six different countries.

Facilities
Franklin Field, with a seating capacity of 52,593,) is where the Quakers play football, field hockey, lacrosse, sprint football and track and field (and formerly baseball, soccer, and rugby). It is the oldest stadium still operating for football games, the first stadium to sport two tiers, and first stadium in the country to have a scoreboard. It hosted the first ever football radio broadcast (in 1922) and first commercially televised football game (in 1940) and was site of first ever use of use of instant replay (in 1963). Franklin Field also played host to the Philadelphia Eagles from 1958 to 1970 (where installation of artificial turf in 1969 caused it to be first NFL stadium to have such artificial turf), and was the site of 18 Army–Navy games between 1899 and 1935.

Today it is also used by Penn students for recreation such as intramural and club sports, including touch football and cricket. Franklin Field hosts the annual collegiate track and field event "the Penn Relays."

Penn's home court, the Palestra, is an arena used for men's and women's basketball teams, volleyball teams, wrestling team, and Philadelphia Big Five basketball, and other high school sporting events. The Palestra has hosted more NCAA Tournament basketball games than any other facility. Penn staff and students make use of the Palestra to play and/or watch basketball, volleyball, and fencing. Penn's River Fields hosts a number of athletic fields including the Rhodes Soccer Stadium (for both women's and men's soccer, which includes elevated stands for 650 spectators, a 180-degree rotating scoreboard, and the Rapaport Family Suite), the Ellen Vagelos C'90 Field Hockey Field (with special artificial turf), and Irving "Moon" Mondschein Throwing Complex (for javelin, shot put, discus, and Hammer throw). In addition, Penn baseball plays its home games at Meiklejohn Stadium at Murphy Field.

The Olympic Boycott Games of 1980 was held at the University of Pennsylvania in response to Moscow's hosting of the 1980 Summer Olympics following the Soviet incursion in Afghanistan. Twenty-nine of the boycotting nations participated in the Boycott Games.

Notable people

Gallery

Overview
Penn has produced many alumni that have distinguished themselves in the sciences, academia, politics, business, military, arts, and media.

Some eleven heads of state or government have attended or graduated from Penn, including former president Donald Trump; former president William Henry Harrison, who attended the medical school for less than a semester; former prime minister of the Philippines Cesar Virata; the first president of Nigeria, Nnamdi Azikiwe; the first president of Ghana, Kwame Nkrumah; and the current president of Ivory Coast, Alassane Ouattara. Other notable politicians who hold a degree from Penn include India's former minister of state for finance Jayant Sinha, former ambassador and Utah governor Jon Huntsman, Jr., Mexico's current minister of finance, Ernesto J. Cordero, former Pennsylvania senator Arlen Specter, and former Pennsylvania governor and DNC chair Ed Rendell.

The university's presence in the judiciary in and outside of the United States is also notable. It has produced three United States Supreme Court justices, William J. Brennan, Owen J. Roberts and James Wilson; Supreme Court justices of foreign states (e.g., Ronald Wilson of the High Court of Australia, Ayala Procaccia of the Israel Supreme Court, Yvonne Mokgoro, former justice of the Constitutional Court of South Africa); and Irish Court of Appeal justice Gerard Hogan.

Penn is also a top feeder school for careers in finance and investment banking on Wall Street and its alumni have a strong presence in financial and economic life. Indeed, Penn alumni include 64 living billionaires, 28 of whom are undergraduate alumni billionaires (as Penn has the second highest number of undergrad billionaire alumni with only Harvard [with only one more (but Penn undergraduate alumni billionaires have accumulated over 65 billion more in wealth than Harvard's)], Penn has educated several governors of central banks including Dawne Williams ( St. Kitts-Nevis-Anguilla National Bank), Yasin Anwar (State Bank of Pakistan), Ignazio Visco (Bank of Italy), Kim Choongsoo (Bank of Korea), Zeti Akhtar Aziz (Central Bank of Malaysia), Pridiyathorn Devakula (governor, Bank of Thailand, and former minister of finance), Farouk El Okdah (Central Bank of Egypt) and Alfonso Prat Gay (Central Bank of Argentina), as well as the director of the United States National Economic Council, Gene Sperling. Other alumni include Warren Buffett  (CEO of Berkshire Hathaway), Steven A. Cohen (founder of SAC Capital Advisors), and Robert Kapito (president of BlackRock, the world's largest asset manager).

Penn alumni who are founders of technology companies include Ralph J. Roberts (co-founder of Comcast); Elon Musk (co-founder of PayPal, Tesla, OpenAI and Neuralink, founder of SpaceX and The Boring Company); Leonard Bosack (co-founder of Cisco); David J. Brown (co-founder of Silicon Graphics) and Mark Pincus (founder of Zynga, the company behind FarmVille).

Among other distinguished alumni are the current or past presidents of over one hundred universities including Harvard University (Drew Gilpin Faust, Harvard's first female president), Cornell University (Martha E. Pollack), Penn (Judith Rodin, first female president in the Ivy League), Princeton University (Harold Dodds), the University of California (Mark Yudof), Carnegie Mellon University (Jared Cohon), and Northwestern University (Morton O. Schapiro).

Penn's alumni also include poets William Augustus Muhlenberg, Ezra Pound and William Carlos Williams; linguist and political theorist Noam Chomsky; architect Louis Kahn; cartoonist Charles Addams; actresses Candice Bergen and Elizabeth Banks; journalist Joe Klein; fashion designer Tory Burch; and alumni who have won 20 Tony Awards, 16 Grammy Awards, 11 Emmy Awards, and 4 Academy Awards (Oscars) as exemplified by EGOT recipient, recording artist John Legend.

Within the ranks of Penn's most historic graduates are also eight signers of the Declaration of Independence and seven signers of the United States Constitution and 24 members of the Continental Congress. These historic figures include George Clymer, Francis Hopkinson, Thomas McKean, Robert Morris, William Paca, George Ross, Benjamin Rush, James Wilson, Thomas Fitzsimons, Jared Ingersoll, Rufus King, Thomas Mifflin, Gouverneur Morris and Hugh Williamson.

Penn alumni have also had significant impact on the United States military as they include Samuel Nicholas, United States Marine Corps founder, and William A. Newell, whose congressional action formed a predecessor to the current United States Coast Guard, in addition to numerous generals or similar rank in the United States Armed Forces, as well as at least five United States Medal of Honor recipients.

As of 2020, there have been 24 Nobel Laureates  affiliated (see List of Nobel laureates by university affiliation), with the University of Pennsylvania, of whom four are current faculty members and eight are alumni. Penn also educated members of the United States National Academies and the Academy of Arts and Sciences, eight National Medal of Science laureates, numerous Sloan Fellows, several members of the American Philosophical Society and many Guggenheim Fellowships.

Alumni relations and inter-Ivy events
In addition to active alumni chapters globally, in 1989, the university bought a 14-story clubhouse building (purpose-built for Yale Club) in New York City from Touro College for $15 million to house Penn's largest alumni chapter. After raising a separate $25 million (including $150,000+ donations each from such alumni as Estee Lauder heirs, Leonard Lauder and Ronald Lauder, Saul Steinberg, Michael Milken, Donald Trump, and Ronald Perelman) and two years of renovation, the Penn Club of New York moved to its current location at 30 West 44th Street on NYC's Clubhouse Row across the street from the Harvard Club of New York, a block west of the Cornell Club of New York, and two blocks west of the Yale Club of New York City. It also is one block north of the Princeton Club of New York and joins with those clubs in inter-Ivy events. Although its university is located in the Morningside Heights section of Manhattan, the Columbia University Club of New York does not have its own clubhouse and shares the 30 West 44th Street clubhouse with the Penn Club. The New York region of the university maintains an office in the Penn Club.

See also

 List of universities by number of billionaire alumni
 Education in Philadelphia
 Think Tanks and Civil Societies Program (TTCSP)
 University of Pennsylvania Press

Notes

References

External links

 
 University of Pennsylvania athletics website

 
1740 establishments in Pennsylvania
Collegiate Gothic architecture in the United States
Colonial colleges
Eastern Pennsylvania Rugby Union
Educational institutions established in 1740
Gothic Revival architecture in Pennsylvania
Philadelphia Big 5
University of Pennsylvania
Universities and colleges in Philadelphia
University City, Philadelphia